Survivor: Worlds Apart — White Collar vs. Blue Collar vs. No Collar is the 30th season of the American CBS competitive reality television series Survivor, which premiered on February 25, 2015, with the season finale on May 20, 2015. It was the fourth Survivor season filmed in San Juan del Sur, Nicaragua (tied with the Philippines and Samoa), the same location as Survivor: Nicaragua, Survivor: Redemption Island, and Survivor: San Juan del Sur, and features three tribes of six new players divided by social class: white collar, blue collar, and no collar. This season introduced the concept of an extra vote, in which one player can vote twice at a single Tribal Council, which was offered during the season's Survivor Auction. This season also saw the return of the firemaking tiebreaker challenge, last used in Survivor: Gabon. 

The two-hour season finale and one-hour reunion special aired on May 20, 2015, where Mike Holloway was named the winner over Carolyn Rivera and Will Sims II in a 6–1–1 vote.

Contestants
The cast is composed of 18 new players, initially split into three tribes containing six members each: Escameca ("Blue Collar"), Masaya ("White Collar"), and Nagarote ("No Collar"). Escameca is named after Playa Escameca, while Masaya and Nagarote both named after the populated places in Nicaragua. The cast includes former football placekicker Tyler Fredrickson. Additionally, So Kim was originally cast on Survivor: San Juan del Sur with her sister Doo, but they dropped out after Doo had a medical emergency the day before the game began.

Future appearances
Mike Holloway, Carolyn Rivera, Shirin Oskooi, Joe Anglim, and Max Dawson were included on the public poll to choose the cast of the subsequent season, Survivor: Cambodia. Due to Holloway winning Worlds Apart, he was ineligible from participating in Cambodia despite placing in the top 10 of his ballot; Anglim and Oskooi were ultimately chosen to compete. Hali Ford and Sierra Dawn Thomas returned for Survivor: Game Changers. Anglim returned again in Survivor: Edge of Extinction.

Outside of Survivor, Anglim competed on the premiere of Candy Crush. Thomas competed with two-time Survivor contestant Abi-Maria Gomes on a Survivor vs Big Brother episode of Fear Factor. In 2020, Oskooi competed on the fourth season of the online reality show Sequester.

Season summary
The eighteen new castaways were divided into three tribes of six based on social class: Escameca (Blue Collar), Masaya (White Collar), and Nagarote (No Collar). Despite frequent arguments between the Blue Collars, they only went to Tribal Council once, as did the White Collars. Though the No Collars lost two members, a core alliance of Hali, Jenn, and Joe formed, with Will as their fourth. With 14 players remaining, the players were redistributed into two tribes of seven; on Escameca, Blue Collar Rodney and White Collar Joaquin aligned, but Rodney's former Blue Collar allies, led by Mike, blindsided Joaquin to break up the pair and retain Rodney's loyalty.

When the tribes merged, two alliances vied for dominance: the No Collar core alliance, now with White Collar Shirin, went against the Blue Collars. Though Rodney remained with the Blue Collars, he constructed his own alliance with the swing votes—Will, and White Collars Tyler and Carolyn—to eventually take down the other Blue Collars to avenge Joaquin; the augmented Blue Collar alliance systematically eliminated the others, unaware of Rodney's alliance. Mike overheard Rodney’s inner alliance plotting his blindside and outed their plans, but instead found himself ousted from the others and made the primary target. However, Mike won five of the last six immunity challenges and played a hidden immunity idol on the only time he was vulnerable, bringing himself to the end of the game alongside Will and Carolyn. Ultimately, for making it to the end despite being a massive target, Mike was awarded with six of the eight jury votes, and the title of Sole Survivor.

Episodes

Voting history

Reception
Despite Jeff Probst hyping up the season as one of the best and suggesting that the winner would become "one of the favorite winners of all time," reception for Worlds Apart was mostly negative. Critics lambasted the negativity and unlikability of the cast, as well as the predictability of the season. 

In a poll conducted by Dalton Ross of Entertainment Weekly, Worlds Apart was ranked as the 5th worst season out of the first 35 seasons of Survivor. Ross himself ranked it 29th out of the 40 aired seasons, stating that there were "not enough people to root for" and criticized Dan Foley's and Will Sims's actions during the season. Worlds Apart was also ranked as the 4th worst season by fan site "The Purple Rock Podcast" in 2020, stating that the cast "quickly disappoints," and that the winner "becomes obvious fairly early on." In 2015, a poll by Rob Has a Podcast and Rob Cesternino ranked Worlds Apart 20th out of 30. This was updated in 2021 during Cesternino's podcast, Survivor All-Time Top 40 Rankings, ranking 35th. In 2020, Inside Survivor ranked this season 36th out of 40 saying that the season had potential during the pre-merge but took a "disturbing turn" after the Survivor Auction.

References

External links
 Official CBS Survivor Website

30
2015 American television seasons
2014 in Nicaragua
Social class in the United States
Television shows filmed in Nicaragua